The Visual Effects Society Award for Outstanding Supporting Visual Effects in a Photoreal Episode is one of the annual awards given by the Visual Effects Society, starting in 2004. While the award's title has changed several time within this period, the recipients have been television episodes and/or movies or specials with less prominent, more subtle visual effects work.

Winners and nominees

2000s
Outstanding Supporting Visual Effects in a Broadcast Program

2010s

Outstanding Supporting Visual Effects in a Visual Effects-Driven Photoreal/Live Action Broadcast Program

Outstanding Visual Effects in a Photoreal Episode

2020s

Programs with multiple awards

2 awards
 Black Sails (Starz)
|}

Programs with multiple nominations

5 nominations
 Vikings (History/Amazon)

4 nominations
 Black Sails (Starz)
 Lost (ABC)

3 nominations
 Boardwalk Empire (HBO)
 Penny Dreadful (Showtime)

2 nominations
 Alias (ABC)
 The Crown (Netflix)
 The Handmaid's Tale (Hulu)
 Hawaii Five-0 (CBS)
 Pushing Daisies (ABC)
 See (Apple TV+)

References

S
Awards established in 2002